Martha Mbugua is the founding  Partner at Law 3Sixty, a legal firm based in Nairobi, Kenya's capital city. She founded the business in 2017.

From 2015 until 2017, Martha Mbugua was a Partner at Hamilton Harrison & Mathews Law Firm, the largest law firm in Kenya, by lawyer count, based in Nairobi, and a member of the Dentons Law Group.

She made Partner in January 2016 at the age of 31, and was one of the youngest people to make partner in the history of that law firm.

Background and education 
She was born in Kenya circa 1985. She attended Loreto High School, Limuru, in Kiambu County, where she obtained her High School Diploma in 2002.

She was admitted to the University of Nairobi, where she graduated with a Bachelor of Laws degree, in 2007. The following year, she underwent the Advocates Training Program at the Kenya School of Law and as admitted to the Kenyan Bar. She also holds a Master of Laws degree, awarded by the University of Birmingham, in the United Kingdom in 2010.

Career
Martha Mbugua's specialties include international commercial law, commercial finance law and mergers & acquisitions. Over a course of eleven years, starting in 2007, she has worked several large law firms. She started out as a legal associate at Mohammed Muigai Advocates, in Nairobi, Kenya, before moving to Bowman Gilfillan in Johannesburg, South Africa, where she worked for a short time. She also spent brief stints at Barclays Bank of Kenya and at the East African Breweries Limited

She returned to Kenya in 2011 and was hired as an associate at Coulson Harney, rising to Senior Associate while there. She left there in 2014 and joined Hamilton Harrison & Mathews that November.

Ms Mbugua was involved in the restructuring of the Kenya Commercial Bank Group to form a non-operating holding company, as the parent and the country-specific banks as subsidiaries. She was also a member of the legal team that advised the government of Kenya when Helios Investment Partners of the United Kingdom acquired majority shareholding in Telkom Kenya, where the government is a minority shareholder.

Other considerations
In October 2017, the Business Daily Africa newspaper named Martha Mbugua, one of the Top 40 Under 40 Women In Kenya 2017. In December 2018, she served as a member of a five-person panel of judges who selected the Top 40 Men Under 40 In Kenya 2018.

For two years in a row, in 2017 and 2018, IFRL 1000, a global ranking agency ranked Martha Mbugua as a "Rising Star", in her field of law practice.

References

External links
 Hamilton Harrison & Mathews concludes merger with top global law firm As of 8 October 2018.

1985 births
Kenyan women lawyers
21st-century Kenyan lawyers
21st-century Kenyan businesswomen
21st-century Kenyan businesspeople
University of Nairobi alumni
Kenya School of Law alumni
Alumni of the University of Birmingham
People from Kiambu County
Living people